Tofazzal Hossain (5 October 1935 – 5 December 2015) was a Bangladeshi language activist, civil servant, journalist, poet, lyricist and writer. He was conferred with Ekushey Padak in 2013 for his contribution to the Language Movement.

Biography
Hossain was born on 9 October 1935 at Rameshwar in Daudkandi of Comilla. He received graduate and postgraduate studies from Dhaka University. Besides his professional career he also wrote books.

Hossain started his career in journalism at The Daily Ittefaq as a sub editor. Later, he joined the government service in 1967. He was an additional chief information officer of the Information Department.

Hossain took part in the Language Movement as a poet and lyricist. He also took part in protest rallies, poster and wall writing. Two songs were included on an anthology Ekushey February which was edited by Hasan Hafizur Rahman. A song of these was written by Hossain. The title of the song was "Rokto Sorone Tomra Ajike Tomake Soron Kori". He received Ekushey Padak in 2013 for his contribution to the Language Movement. He was a fellow of Bangla Academy.

Hossain died on 5 December 2015 at the age of 80.

Selected bibliography

Poetry
 Hridoy Roktorage
 Ekush Vubonmoy
 Notun Juger Vore
 Kobita Somogro

Research book
 Jonosongkhya Bisforon O Agami Prithibi
 Shishu : Bishwa O Bangladesh Prekshapoth
  Biponno Prithibi Biponno Jonopod
 Kashmir : Itihas Kotha Koy
 Safolyer Sondhane
 Jatisongho Ebong Lyndon Johnson

References

1935 births
2015 deaths
People from Comilla District
Bengali language movement activists
Recipients of the Ekushey Padak
University of Dhaka alumni
Bangladeshi male writers
Bangladeshi male poets
Bangladeshi civil servants
Bangladeshi journalists
Bangladeshi lyricists
Honorary Fellows of Bangla Academy